Tore Sagen (born November 7, 1980) is a Norwegian comedian, radio host and actor. He is best known for his role as the co-host and technician of Radioresepsjonen.

References

External links

1984 births
Living people
Norwegian male film actors
Norwegian male television actors
Norwegian radio presenters
Norwegian male comedians
Male actors from Oslo